Basaveshwaranagara is a largely residential neighbourhood in the west of Bengaluru, Karnataka, India. It is located to the west of Rajajinagara and is sandwiched between the localities of Mahalakshmi Layout to the north and Vijayanagara to the south, spread across multiple sub-localities, three assembly constituencies and seven Bruhat Bengaluru Mahanagara Palike (BBMP) wards. The area of Basaveshwaranagara is often considered West of Chord Road as it lies to the west of Chord Road, an arterial road in the western part of Bengaluru.

Etymology
Basaveshwaranagara is named after Basavanna (also known as Basaveshwara), a social reformer whose followers comprise the Lingayat community.

History
Basaveshwaranagara was formed as an extension by the City Improvement Trust Board (currently the Bangalore Development Authority) in stages between the 1970s and early 1980s. At that time (even now unofficially), the area was known as West of Chord Road (WCR), as it lay to the west of the Chord Road which at the time was considered the western end of the city. There were also many private layouts in the area formed in the 1970s by public and private sector organisations for their employees such as LIC, Kirloskar Group, SBI and BEML among others. The close proximity of Basaveshwaranagara to the Krantivira Sangolli Rayanna Bengaluru Station, Kempegowda Bus Station, the Bengaluru Pete, residential-cum-commercial localities like Rajajinagara and Malleswara and the Peenya industrial area helped its growth. Today, Basaveshwaranagara is an important residential and commercial hub in West Bangalore. But since Basaveshwaranagara is very far away from the IT Corridor (a large area in the eastern and south-eastern parts of Bangalore city with IT and software parks and SEZs), large-scale development in the area has been minimal and Basaveshwaranagara is today considered one of the greenest and more conservative localities of Bengaluru city.

Geography

Basaveshwaranagara is situated in the western part of Bangalore, about 914 metres above sea level, at 12°98' N and 77°53' E. Nearby areas include Rajajinagara, Mahalakshmi Layout, Nandini Layout, Laggere, Sunkadakatte and Vijayanagara.

The terrain of Basaveshwaranagara is quite hilly and uneven. The area is known for its steep and hilly roads which rise high and low. The area was also known for lakes such as the Agrahara Dasarahalli Lake, Kurubarahalli Lake and Saneguruvahalli Lake among others. All the lakes have dried up in recent time and residential layouts or parks have been built over them.

Basaveshwaranagara is considered to be the least polluted locality in Bengaluru city, with real-time air quality level coming well within Good levels of 0–50 most of the time. There is an air quality monitoring station at Saneguruvanahalli maintained by the Karnataka State Pollution Control Board (KSPCB).

Climate
Under the Köppen climate classification, Bangalore including Basaveshwaranagar itself experiences a tropical savanna climate (Aw). Due to its high elevation, a more moderate climate throughout the year is experienced, although occasional heat waves can make summer somewhat uncomfortable. Winter temperatures rarely drop below , and summer temperatures seldom exceed . Receiving rainfall from both the northeast and the southwest monsoons ; the wettest months are September, October and August. The summer heat is moderated by fairly frequent thunderstorms, which occasionally cause power outages and local flooding. The heaviest rainfall recorded in a 24-hour period is  recorded on 1 October 1997.

Localities

Basaveshwaranagara is divided into four stages, which are further subdivided into blocks. The area also subsumes sub-localities such as:

 Agrahara Dasarahalli
 Ashtagrama Layout
 Bhimajyothinagara
 Bovi Colony
 Gruhalakshmi Layout
 Indiranagara
 Kamalanagara
 Kamalanagara Bharat Earth Movers Limited (BEML) Layout
 Karnataka Housing Board (KHB) Colony
 Kirloskar Colony
 Kurubarahalli
 Lakshmi Nagara
 Life Insurance Corporation of India (LIC) Model Housing Colony
 Manjunatha Nagara
 Saneguruvanahalli
 Sathyanarayana Layout
 Shakthi Ganapathi Nagara
 Sharada Colony
 Shivanagar
 Shivanahalli
 Sri Venkateshwara Krupa (SVK) Layout
 State Bank of India (SBI) Colony
 SVNGSS Layout
 Teachers Colony
 Vinayaka Housing Board Cooperative Society (VHBCS) Layout

Civic administration

Politics

Basaveshwaranagar comes under three Vidhan Sabha constituencies: Rajajinagar, Mahalakshmi Layout and Govindarajanagar, which are led by former Minister S. Suresh Kumar (BJP), K. Gopalaiah (JD(S)) and former Minister V. Somanna (BJP) respectively. While most of Basaveshwaranagar falls under the Rajajinagar constituency, some sub-localities like LIC Model Housing Colony, Bhimajyothinagar, Kirloskar Colony, Shakthi Ganapathi Nagar, Sathyanarayana Layout, SBI Colony, Kamalanagar and Kurubarahalli come under the Mahalakshmi Layout constituency. Agrahara Dasarahalli comes under the Govindarajanagar constituency. Rajajinagar, Mahalakshmi Layout and Govindarajanagar assembly constituencies in turn fall under the Lok Sabha constituencies of Bangalore Central, Bangalore North and Bangalore South respectively. While Bangalore Central and North constituencies are represented by P. C. Mohan (BJP) and former Chief Minister of Karnataka D. V. Sadananda Gowda (BJP) respectively, Bangalore South is represented by Tejasvi Surya (BJP), who is the youngest Member of Parliament as of 2019.

BBMP wards

Basaveshwaranagar is spread across seven wards of the Bruhat Bengaluru Mahanagara Palike (BBMP). One of these wards (Ward 100) goes by the name of Basaveshwaranagar itself. Barring this ward and also Ward 74 (Shakthi Ganapathi Nagar), none of the other BBMP wards fully lie within Basaveshwaranagar.

Post office
Basaveshwaranagar post office is located along the Siddaiah Puranik Road, opposite S. Cadambi Vidya Kendra. The pincode for the area is 560079. However, the northern parts of Basaveshwaranagar like Kirloskar Colony, Bhimajyothinagar and Kurubarahalli among others come under the Mahalakshmi Layout post office. The pincode for this post office is 560086.

Police station
Basaveshwaranagar has its own police station. The police station was earlier located near Havanur Circle opposite to Pavithra Paradise. It was later shifted to its current location on the 1st Main Road, near to the Dr. Ambedkar stadium. It comes under the jurisdiction of West division DCP of Bangalore city and Vijayanagar division ACP.

The area does not have its own traffic police station and falls under the Vijayanagar Traffic Police jurisdiction.

Transport

Roads

The main roads of Basaveshwaranagar are:

 Siddaiah Puranik Road: It is also known as the 1st Cross Road and is the main commercial hub of Basaveshwaranagar with many shopping centres, banks, restaurants and hospitals. It connects Shankar Mutt in the north with Magadi Road in the south.
 60 Feet Road: It is also known as the 1st Main Road. It connects Chord Road in the east with the Basaveshwaranagar Bus Stand in the west. Like Siddaiah Puranik Road, this road is also an important commercial hub. This road intersects with Siddaiah Puranik Road at Havanur Circle.
 Dr. M. C. Modi Hospital Road: This road connects Chord Road in the east with Shankar Mutt in the west. The Modi Eye Hospital is located on this road, hence this road is named as Dr. M. C. Modi Hospital Road.

Apart from these roads, there are other important roads in the locality such as 8th Main Road (BEML Layout Road), 15th Main Road (Kamalanagar Main Road), Kurubarahalli Main Road and Thimmaiah Road (Shivanahalli Main Road).

Metro
Basaveshwaranagar is easily accessible from both the Green Line and Purple Line of the Namma Metro. The nearest station on the Green Line is Rajajinagar, which is located 2 km from Basaveshwaranagar, while the nearest Purple Line station, Hosahalli, is 3 km away. Basaveshwaranagar's connectivity to the Namma Metro will be further improved after Phase 3 of the Namma Metro is completed, where a line from Magadi Road to Kadabagere passing through KHB Colony and Kamakshipalya will be built.

Buses

Bangalore Metropolitan Transport Corporation (BMTC) runs a good fleet of buses to Basaveshwaranagar, connecting it with all the important business districts in the city. There are seven bus stations in the locality:

Basaveshwaranagar Main Bus Stand in 60 Feet Road (Also known as Sharada Colony Bus Stand as it is located in Sharada Colony)
BEML Layout Bus Stand in 8th Main Road
Shankar Nag Bus Station in Kamalanagar
Basaveshwaranagar 3rd Stage Bus Stand in Saneguruvanahalli
KHB Colony Bus Stand in Magadi Road
Bhimajyothinagar Bus Stand near Shankar Mutt
Kurubarahalli Bus Stand

The Kempegowda Bus Station for boarding intercity and interstate buses is just 5 km away from Basaveshwaranagar.

Economy

Basaveshwaranagar is home to many industry, banking and retail outlets.

The Siddaiah Puranik Road is the main commercial hub of Basaveshwaranagar. It has many stores ranging from supermarkets and bakeries to pharmacies, branded and generic clothing retail and watch shops among others. Many public sector and private sector bank branches are located along this road as well. The Kurubarahalli Main Road and the 60 Feet Road also have many shopping and banking facilities. Off Havanur Circle is the roadside Basaveshwaranagar market, which sells fresh fruits and vegetables apart from serving street food.

Basaveshwaranagar is also home to a considerable number of restaurants, which includes international dining chains, ice-cream parlours, coffee shops, multi-cuisine and cuisine-specific restaurants. The locality, due to its considerable North Karnataka population, has many "khanavalis" which serve authentic North Karnataka cuisine. Some famous restaurants in Basaveshwaranagar include Pavithra Paradise near Havanur Circle, Sri Guru Sagar, Cave N Dine, Le Arabia, Kadamba and Priyadarshini Grand to name a few.

Shri Mahila Griha Udyog Lijjat Papad, a cooperative known for the Lijjat Papad brand, has an office in Basaveshwaranagar, near Havanur Circle.

Educational institutions
Basaveshwaranagar has a considerable number of educational institutions, both at the primary/secondary education and higher education level.

The area consists of renowned schools such as Carmel High School, Sri Vani Education Centre, National Academy For Learning (NAFL), S. Cadambi Vidya Kendra, St. Mira's High School, VLS International School and Florence High School to name a few. The famous National Public School, Rajajinagar is located just outside Basaveshwaranagar on the Chord Road. There are also pre-university colleges including Carmel Pre-University College, S. Cadambi Independent Pre-University College and Vidya Vardhaka Sangha (VVS) Sardar Patel Pre-University College. One Karnataka Government aided degree college V.V.S. First Grade College.

Basaveshwaranagar also has two government colleges: the Government Homeopathic Medical College and Hospital located on Siddaiah Puranik Road near KHB Colony bus stop and the Government Unani Medical College and Hospital off Havanur Circle.

Recreation
Basaveshwaranagar has many recreational spaces including parks, open grounds and stadiums.

Most prominent among these recreational facilities is the Dr. B. R. Ambedkar Stadium, which is located on the 60 Feet Road. It is built over the now-dried up Agarahara Darahalli Lake and has several sporting facilities, including a running track for walking, jogging and athletic events, a skating rink, a basketball court as well as facilities for kho-kho, kabaddi, cricket, badminton and taekwondo. It also plays host to Sports Day events of nearby schools which do not have a playground of their own.

Another prominent recreational space is the Nethaji Subhas Chandra Bose ground at Saneguruvanahalli. It is popularly known as "Bose Park" and is built over the now-dried up Saneguruvanahalli Lake. It has both a park with facilities for walking as well as play and gym equipment and an open ground with facilities for playing cricket, football and other outdoor sports.

There is a famous park in Sharada Colony known as the Sir M. Visvesvaraya Aalada Marada Udyanavana. It was famous for its banyan tree ("Aalada Marada" in Kannada), which was more than 500 years old and was home to hundreds of monkeys and birds and hence is also unofficially known as "Big Banyan Park" or "Monkey Park". The tree collapsed in 2009, however, efforts have since been made to translocate a banyan tree from another location to the park. The park has facilities for walking and also a children's recreational area.

Some of the other parks and open spaces in Basaveshwaranagar include the Motappa Park at Manjunatha Nagar, the Kuvempu ground which is an open space used for playing cricket, football and volleyball, the Swami Vivekananda Park near Shankar Mutt, the Udaya Ravi Park at Kirloskar Colony and the Subhas Chandra Bose Park at Agrahara Dasarahalli, to name a few. The latter park is said to be the first park in Bangalore to offer free Wi-Fi.

There is a single cinema hall in the locality, the Veerabhadreshwara Theatre at Kamalanagar near to the BEML Layout Bus Stop. It predominantly shows Kannada films.

Hospitals

Basaveshwaranagar has a wide range of medical specialties practiced through these prominent hospitals:

Basaveshwaranagar has ample number of clinics and nursing homes across. The availability of medicine is fulfilled by the in house pharmacy of these hospitals and many prominent local pharmacies.

Places of Worship

Temples

There are many Hindu temples in Basaveshwaranagar. The Sri Avani Sringeri Jagadguru Shankaracharya Mahasamsthanam, a breakaway mutt of the Sringeri Sharada Peetham, is located at Basaveshwaranagar, particularly in the sublocality of Bhimajyothinagar at the junction of Siddaiah Puranik Road, Kurubarahalli Main Road, Dr. M. C. Modi Hospital Road and the Mahalakshmi Layout 14th Main Road. This road junction and the surrounding area is commonly known as Shankar Mutt. Even the BBMP ward where the mutt is situated (Ward 75) takes the name of Shankar Mutt. The mutt premises includes a sma
ll temple dedicated to Goddess Sri Sharadamba, a hall used for religious ceremonies and a sub post office with the pincode 560079.

Another notable temple is the Sri Ganapathi Temple located on the 8th Main Road, near BEML Layout Bus Stop. The temple, situated on a small hillock, includes a small temple complex with temples dedicated to Hindu gods of both the Shaiva and Vaishnavism tradition.

Other important temples in the locality include the Sri Lakshmi Narayana Swami Temple near Havanur Circle, the Sri Subramanya Swami Temple, the Sri Varasiddhi Vinayaka and the Sri Varapradha Lakshmivenkateshwara Temple at Kurubarahalli, the Sri Varasiddhi Vinayaka Temple at Saneguruvanahalli and the Sri Sai Baba Temple at Gruhalakshmi Layout.

Churches
Basaveshwaranagar has a very insignificant number of churches, but there is the Trinity Marthoma Church at Kamalanagar, a small church with the congregation being from the Malayalam-speaking Marthoma Christian community.

Mosques
There are a few mosques in Basaveshwaranagar such as the Makkah Masjid, Jamia Majid and Masjid-e-Nimra.

Notable residents
 V. Balakrishnan, former CFO of Infosys and AAP candidate for Bangalore Central Parliamentary Constituency in the 2014 Lok Sabha election
 Ramachandra Gowda, BJP leader and former Medical Education Minister, Government of Karnataka
 S. Suresh Kumar, BJP leader, MLA for Rajajinagar (as of 2018) and current Primary and Secondary Education Minister, Government of Karnataka
 Kannada Cinema Director Bhargava

References

Neighbourhoods in Bangalore